The 1970–71 season was the 25th season in FK Partizan's existence. This article shows player statistics and matches that the club played during the 1970–71 season.

Competitions

Yugoslav First League

Yugoslav Cup

Napredak won on penalties.

See also
 List of FK Partizan seasons

References

External links
 Official website
 Partizanopedia 1970-71  (in Serbian)

FK Partizan seasons
Partizan